National Adhering Organizations (NAO) in chemistry are the organizations that work as the authoritative power over chemistry in an individual country.  Their importance can be seen by their involvement in IUPAC.  There are currently fifty-seven IUPAC National Adhering Organizations.

List of NAOs

References

Chemistry organizations